Reticulocytopenia is the medical term for an abnormal decrease of reticulocytes in the body. Reticulocytes are new, immature red blood cells.

Causes 
Reticulocytopenia is usually a result of viral parvovirus B19 infection, which invades and destroys red blood cell precursors and halts the red cell production.

If infection occurs in individuals with sickle cell anemia, spherocytosis, or beta thalassemia, it will lead to incorporation of two anemia-induced mechanisms: decreased red cell production and hemolysis. The result is a rapid and severe anemia (aplastic crisis) which may require blood transfusion.

Diagnosis

See also 
 Erythropoiesis – process of creating red blood cells
 Hemolytic anemia – reduced number of red blood cells due to destruction of the cells after they were made
 Nutritional anemia – reduced number of red blood cells due to vitamin deficiency or other dietary factors
 Spherocytosis- the shape of red blood cell becomes spherical than bi-concave.

References

External links 

Red blood cell disorders